Alice Mary Prior  (born 22 April 1942) served as Lord Lieutenant of Bristol from 2007 to 2017. She is currently the Pro-chancellor of University of Bristol and a trustee of  the environmental fund Viridor Credits.

Until her retirement in 1997 she was Sales and Marketing Director of Alexandra, a major workwear and uniform company.

She was given an honorary degree by the University of the West of England "in recognition of her outstanding contribution to local public service, and her advisory support to the Bristol Business School and her support for and links with significant stakeholders of the University of the West of England" and is patron or president of a number of charities based in the Bristol area.

Since being appointed Lord-Lieutenant, Prior has also been made chair of the Commission for Bristol and Avon Magistrates.

Since 2008, Prior has been a member of The Society of Merchant Venturers.

Personal life 
Prior was born in Hambrook and educated at Kingswood Grammar School. She is married to John and they have two children and four grandchildren.

References

External links 
 The Lord-Lieutenant of the County & City of Bristol
 Profile: Mary Prior MBE DStJ JP The Society of Merchant Venturers

1942 births
Place of birth missing (living people)
Living people
Lord-Lieutenants of Bristol
Members of the Order of the British Empire
Commanders of the Royal Victorian Order
Members of the Society of Merchant Venturers